Murshidabad Adarsha Mahavidyalaya, established in 1981, is a general degree college in Chak Islampur, in Murshidabad district. It offers undergraduate courses in arts. It is affiliated to  University of Kalyani.

Accreditation
The college is recognized by the University Grants Commission (UGC).

See also

References

External links
Murshidabad Adarsha Mahavidyalaya
University of Kalyani
University Grants Commission
National Assessment and Accreditation Council

Colleges affiliated to University of Kalyani
Educational institutions established in 1981
Universities and colleges in Murshidabad district
1981 establishments in West Bengal